Sanam Chai Khet is a district (amphoe) in the eastern part of Chachoengsao province, central Thailand.

History
Mueang Sanam Chai Khet was a city of the Ayutthaya Kingdom, a contemporary of neighboring Mueang Phanat Nikhom and Phanom Sarakham.

Being part of Phanom Sarakham district, on 6 January 1966 the three tambons, Khu Yai Mi, Tha Kradan, and Tha Takiap, were split off to form the minor district (king amphoe) Sanam Chai (สนามไชย). It was renamed Sanam Chai Ket on 14 December 1972, and upgraded to a full district on 28 June 1973.

Geography
Neighboring districts are (from the west clockwise): Plaeng Yao and Phanom Sarakham of Chachoengsao Province; Si Maha Phot and Kabin Buri of Prachinburi province; Khao Chakan of Sa Kaeo province; Tha Takiap of Chachoengsao Province; and Ko Chan of  Chonburi province.

Administration

Central administration 
Sanam Chai Khet is divided into four sub-districts (tambons), which are further subdivided into 70 administrative villages (mubans).

Missing numbers are tambon which now form Tha Takiap.

Local administration 
There is one sub-district municipality (thesaban tambon) in the district, Sanam Chai Khet consisting of parts of sub-district Khu Yai Mi.

There are four sub-district administrative organizations (SAO) in the district:
 Khu Yai Mi consisting of parts of sub-district Khu Yai Mi.
 Tha Kradan consisting of sub-district Tha Kradan.
 Thung Phraya consisting of sub-district Thung Phraya.
 Lat Krathing consisting of sub-district Lat Krathing.

References

External links
amphoe.com

Sanam Chai Khet